Tinnitus retraining therapy (TRT) is a form of habituation therapy designed to help people who experience tinnitus, a ringing, buzzing, hissing, or other sound in the ears when no external sound is present.  Two key components of TRT directly follow from the neurophysiological model of tinnitus. One of these principles includes directive counseling aimed at reclassification of tinnitus to a category of neutral signals, while the other includes sound therapy which is aimed at weakening tinnitus related neuronal activity.

The goal of TRT is management of the reaction to tinnitus, thereby allowing habituation to begin and return to previous levels of perception. There is no evidence that Tinnitus Retraining Therapy or any other therapy can reduce or eliminate tinnitus. 
An alternative to TRT is tinnitus masking, the use of noise, music or other environmental sounds to obscure or mask the tinnitus.  Hearing aids can provide a partial masking effect for the condition. Results from a review of tinnitus retraining therapy trials indicate that it may be a more effective treatment than tinnitus masking.

Applicability
Not everyone who experiences tinnitus is significantly bothered by it. However, some of the problems caused by tinnitus include annoyance, anxiety, panic, and loss of sleep and/or concentration. The distress of tinnitus is strongly associated with various psychological factors; loudness, duration and other characteristics of the tinnitus are secondary.

TRT may offer real although moderate improvement in tinnitus suffering for adults with moderate-to-severe tinnitus, in the absence of hyperacusis, significant hearing loss and/or depression. Not everyone is a good candidate for TRT.  Factors associated with suitability for TRT and predisposing for favorable outcome are: lower loudness of tinnitus, higher pitch of tinnitus, shorter duration of tinnitus since onset, recognition of tinnitus attenuation by sound generator, lower hearing thresholds (i.e. better hearing), high Tinnitus Handicap Inventory (THI) score, and positive attitude toward therapy.

Other secondary hearing symptoms
Despite the fact that there haven't been any recent studies which concluded in its optimal treatment, tinnitus retraining therapy has been applied to treating hyperacusis, misophonia, and phonophobia.

Cause

Physiological basis
It has been proposed that tinnitus is caused by mechanisms that generate abnormal neural activity, specifically one mechanism called discordant damage (dysfunction) of outer and inner hair cells of the cochlea.

Psychological model

The psychological basis for TRT stems from the hypothesis that the brain may exhibit a high level of plasticity relevant to auditory stimuli. In turn, this allows it to adjust to any sensory signals as long as they do not lead to negative effects. TRT is imputed to work by interfering with the neural activity causing the tinnitus at its source, in order to prevent it from spreading to other nervous systems such as the limbic and autonomic nervous systems.

Methodologies

The full TRT program lasts 12 to 24 months and consists of an initial triage of clients for different emphasis during therapy, then a combination of directed counseling and sound therapy.

Classification
Clients are classified into 5 categories. These categories are numbered 0 to 4, and based on whether or not the patient has tinnitus with hearing loss, tinnitus with no hearing loss, tinnitus with hearing loss and hyperacusis, and tinnitus with hearing loss and hyperacusis for an extended amount of time.

Counseling

The first component of TRT, directive counseling, may change the way tinnitus is perceived. The patient is taught the basic knowledge about the auditory system and its function, the mechanism of tinnitus generation and the annoyance associated with tinnitus. The repetition of these points in the follow-up visits helps the patient to perceive the signal as a non-danger.

Sound therapy
The second component of TRT is use of a sound generator to partially mask the tinnitus. This is done with a hearing-aid type of device that emits a low level broadband noise so that the
ear can hear both the noise and tinnitus. This is intended to acclimate the brain to learning a reduced emphasis on the tinnitus versus the external sound. However, a recent study found that a full tinnitus masker was just as effective as partial masking, nullifying a key component of habituation therapy. Other review studies have found no value to the sound therapy component of TRT.

Efficacy
Measuring the efficacy of TRT is beset by confounding factors: tinnitus reporting is entirely subjective therefore not reliable; tinnitus or at least subjects' perception of it varies over time and repeated evaluations are not consistent. Researchers have noted that there is a large placebo component to tinnitus management.  In many commercial TRT practices, there is a large proportion of dropouts; reported 'success' ratios may not take these subjects into account.

There are few available studies, but most show that tinnitus naturally declines over time (years) in a large proportion of subjects surveyed, without any treatment. The annoyance of tinnitus also tends to decline over time.  In at least some, tinnitus spontaneously disappears.

A Cochrane review found only one sufficiently rigorous study of TRT and noted that while the study suggested benefit in the treatment of tinnitus, the study quality was not good enough to draw firm conclusions. A separate Cochrane review of sound therapy (though they called it masking), an integral part of TRT, found no convincing evidence of the efficacy of sound therapy in the treatment of tinnitus.

A summary in The Lancet concluded that in the only decent study, TRT was more effective than masking; in another study in which TRT was used as a control methodology, TRT showed a small benefit.  A study which compared cognitive behavior therapy (CBT) in combination with the counselling part of TRT versus standard care (ENT, audiologist, maskers, hearing aid) found that the specialized care had a positive effect on quality of life as well as specific tinnitus metrics.

Clinical practice
Tinnitus activities treatment (TAT) is a clinical adaptation of TRT that focuses on four areas: thoughts and emotions, hearing and communication, sleep, and concentration.

Progressive tinnitus management (PTM) is a 5-step structured clinical protocol for management of tinnitus which may include tinnitus retraining therapy. The five steps are:
 triage – determining appropriate referral, i.e. audiology, ENT, emergency medical intervention, or mental health evaluation;
 audiologic evaluation of hearing loss, tinnitus, hyperacusis and other symptoms;
 group education about causes and management of tinnitus;
 interdisciplinary evaluation of tinnitus;
 individual management of tinnitus.

The U.S. Department of Veterans Affairs (VA) now employs PTM to help patients self-manage their tinnitus.

Research
 Sound therapy for tinnitus may be more effective if the sound is patterned (i.e. varying in frequency or amplitude) rather than static.
 For persons with severe or disabling tinnitus, techniques that are minimally surgical involving magnetic or electrical stimulation of areas of the brain involved in auditory processing may suppress tinnitus.
 Notched music therapy, in which ordinary music is altered by a one octave notch filter centered at the tinnitus frequency, may reduce tinnitus.

Alternatives

Cognitive behavioral therapy
Cognitive behavioral therapy (CBT), the counselling part of TRT, as a generalized type of psychological and behavioral counselling, has also been used by itself in the management of tinnitus.

Hearing aids
If tinnitus is associated with hearing loss, a tuned hearing aid that amplifies sound in the frequency range of the hearing loss (usually the high frequencies) may effectively mask tinnitus by raising the level of environmental sound, in addition to the benefit of restoring hearing.

Masking 

White noise generators or environmental music may be used to provide a background noise level that is of sufficient amplitude that it wholly or partially 'masks' the tinnitus (tinnitus masker).  Composite hearing aids that combine amplification and white noise
generation are also available.

Other
Numerous other non-TRT methods have been suggested for the treatment or management of tinnitus.
 pharmacological – No drug has been approved by the U.S. Food and Drug Administration (FDA) for treating tinnitus. However, various pharmacological treatments, including antidepressants, anxiolytics, vasodilators and vasoactive substances, and intravenous lidocaine have been prescribed for tinnitus
 lifestyle and support – Things like loud noise, alcohol, caffeine, nicotine, quiet environments and psychological conditions like stress and depression may exacerbate tinnitus.  Reducing or controlling these may help manage the condition.
 alternative medicine – vitamin, antioxidant and herbal preparations (notably Ginkgo biloba extract, also called EGb761) are advertised as treatments or cures for tinnitus.  However, none are approved by the FDA, and controlled clinical trials on their efficacy are lacking.

See also
 Operant conditioning
 Safe listening
 Hearing loss

References

Literature

Ear procedures
Audiology
Mind–body interventions
Behaviorism
Music therapy
Counseling
Behavior therapy
Cognitive therapy
Alternative medicine